DYQC (106.7 FM), broadcasting as DWIZ 106.7, is a radio station owned and operated by Aliw Broadcasting Corporation. Its studio and offices are located at the G/F Fortune Life Bldg., Osmeña Blvd. Cebu City, and its transmitter is located along M.L. Quezon St., Maguikay, Mandaue.

History
The station began operations on August 1, 1994 as Q106. It carried a Top 40 format.

In 1999, the station was rebranded as Home Radio Q106 and switched to an easy listening format. However, the Q106 brand was dropped the following year, when Home Radio was then implemented by its provincial stations. Aside from its usual programming on Weekdays, it aired a variety hits programming every Sundays. Its notable program was The Weekend Easy 10, wherein listeners can vote in for their favorite songs. In 2007, Home Radio Cebu switched back to an Top 40 format with the slogan "Today's Hit Music".

On March 17, 2014, Home Radio Cebu, along with the other provincial stations, reformatted into a mass based format, with a new slogan, "Natural!". On April 5, 2015, the station switched to a Top 40 format with an emphasis on OPM, simply known as CHR Local. It adapted the new positioner "Be You". By the end of 2015, Home Radio shifted to a full-fledged Top 40 station. It dropped the slogan "Natural!" in favor of "The Music of Now" and the catchphrase "The Home of the Millennials".

In July 2017, Home Radio (now read as one-o-six-seven) returned to its original easy listening format with the slogan "It Feels Good to be Home". In 2018, Home Radio's provincial stations started simulcasting DWIZ 882's program Karambola, thus allowing the station to include news and commentaries to the station's format. In 2021, the simulcast expanded to include the entire morning block of DWIZ 882.

In 2021, as part of the country's distance learning initiative amid the COVID-19 pandemic, the Cebu City School Division launched EdRadio, which airs various lessons and modules to students.

On December 16, 2021, Home Radio went off the air after its building and transmitter tower were destroyed by Typhoon "Odette" (Rai). It resumed operations on April 22, 2022, this time with a newly installed 10,000-watt transmitter inside the RPN Compound in Maguikay, Mandaue.

On January 16, 2023, the station dropped the Home Radio branding, but continued its programming. On January 30, 2023 it was relaunched under the DWIZ network with a news and talk format.

References

DWIZ
Radio stations established in 1994
News and talk radio stations in the Philippines